Marek Dubeň (born 11 July 1994) is a Slovak football defender who currently plays for Nitra.

FC Nitra
He made his professional debut for Nitra against Dukla Banská Bystrica, entering in as a substitute in place of Henrich Benčík on 20 April 2013.

External links
FC Nitra profile
Corgoň Liga profile

Eurofotbal profile

References

1994 births
Living people
Slovak footballers
Association football defenders
FC Nitra players
Radomiak Radom players
MFK Lokomotíva Zvolen players
Slovak Super Liga players
Expatriate footballers in Poland
Sportspeople from Nitra